William John Smith (13 May 1882 – date of death unknown) was an English cricketer.  Smith was a right-handed batsman who bowled right-arm fast-medium.  He was born at Freasley, Warwickshire.

Smith made a single first-class appearance for Warwickshire against Hampshire at Edgbaston in the 1906 County Championship.  Hampshire made 261 in their first-innings, with Smith taking the wickets of Phil Mead and William Jephson to finish with figures of 2/83 from 21 overs.  In response Warwickshire made 493 in their first-innings, with Smith being dismissed for a duck by Mead.  Hampshire ended their second-innings, in which Smith bowled 2 wicketless overs, on 64/1.  The match ended in a draw.  This was his only major appearance for Warwickshire.

References

External links
William Smith at ESPNcricinfo
William Smith at CricketArchive

1882 births
Year of death unknown
People from the Borough of North Warwickshire
English cricketers
Warwickshire cricketers